ISFiC Press is the small press publishing arm of ISFiC.  It often produces books by the Author Guest of Honor at Windycon, an annual Chicago science fiction convention, launching the appropriate title at the convention.

Although the press officially released its first book,  Robert J. Sawyer's Relativity, on November 12, 2004, the people responsible for the press issued a filk CD two years earlier, entitled A Walk on the Windy Side.  That CD is considered to be the press's first project.

A Walk on the Windy Side includes songs by Charles de Lint and Juanita Coulson as well as readings by Frederik Pohl and Kristine Smith.

In addition to stories and essays by Sawyer, Relativity includes an introduction by Mike Resnick, an afterword by Valerie Broege and a cover by Jael.  Relativity won the Prix Aurora Award for best English Work (Other) for 2004.

ISFiC Press released its first two novels, Every Inch a King, by Harry Turtledove with a cover by Bob Eggleton, and The Cunning Blood, by Jeff Duntemann with a cover by Todd Cameron Hamilton on November 11, 2005.

In 2006, ISFiC Press published its first non-fiction book, Worldcon Guest of Honor Speeches, edited by Mike Resnick and Joe Siclari, which was nominated for a Hugo Award for Best Related Book.  In November of that year they published Outbound, a collection of short stories by Jack McDevitt.

In August 2012 ISFiC Press issued its first electronic book, Win Some, Lose Some:  The Hugo Award Winning (and Nominated) Short Science Fiction and Fantasy of Mike Resnick (by Mike Resnick; Cover by Vincent Di Fate) as well as the hardcover edition of the same title.  The e-book is offered in EPUB and MOBI format.  The publication of this book is coincident with Chicon 7, the 70th World Science Fiction Convention, which was held in ISFiC Press's hometown of Chicago.
 
The publisher and editor of ISFiC Press from its inception until 2012 was Steven H Silver and the business manager is Bill Roper.

ISFiC Press publications
Relativity: Stories and Essays, by Robert J. Sawyer (2004)
Every Inch a King, by Harry Turtledove (2005)
The Cunning Blood, by Jeff Duntemann (2005) 	
Worldcon Guest of Honor Speeches, edited by Mike Resnick and Joe Siclari (2006)
Outbound, by Jack McDevitt (2006) 
Finding Magic, by Tanya Huff (2007) 
When Diplomacy Fails, edited by Eric Flint and Mike Resnick (2008)
The Shadow on the Doorstep, by James P. Blaylock (2009) 
Assassin and Other Stories, by Steven Barnes (2010)
Aurora in Four Voices, by Catherine Asaro (2011) 
Win Some, Lose Some: the Hugo Award Winning (and Nominated) Short Science Fiction and Fantasy of Mike Resnick, by Mike Resnick (2012) 	
Velveteen vs. the Junior Super Patriots, by Seanan McGuire (2012)
The Goblin Master's Grimoire, by Jim C. Hines (2013) 
Velveteen vs. the Multiverse, by Seanan McGuire (2013)
Harvest Season: an Anthology, by the SF Squeecast (Catherynne M. Valente, Michael Damian Thomas, Seanan McGuire, and Elizabeth Bear) (2014)
Bimbo on the Cover, by Maya Kaathryn Bohnhoff (2015)
Velveteen vs. the Seasons, by Seanan McGuire (2016)

References

External links
ISFiC Press

American speculative fiction publishers
Publishing companies established in 2004
Science fiction publishers
Small press publishing companies